The following is a list of players who have been captains of the St Kilda Football Club (Australian rules football) in the Australian Football League (AFL), formerly the VFL.

VFL/AFL

AFL Women's

References

St Kilda
Captains
St Kilda Football Club captains